And Then There Was One may refer to:

Films
 And Then There Was One (1994 film), a 1994 television film
 And Then There Was One (2016 film), a 2016 documentary film on the history of Southern Railway 4501

Television
 "And Then There Was One", 1 1969 episode of The Outcasts
 "And Then There Was One", a 1987 episode of The Golden Girls
 "And Then There Was One", a 2010 episode of Persons Unknown
 "And Then There Was One", a 2012 episode of Private Practice, season 5.
 "And Then There Was One", a 2014 episode of A Crime to Remember

Other
 A line from the 1868 minstrel show song "Ten Little Injuns" by Septimus Winner
 And Then There Was One, the billing for the 2001 Bernard Hopkins vs. Félix Trinidad boxing match

See also
 And Then There Were None, 1938 mystery novel by Agatha Christie
 And Then There Was No One, 2009 novel by Gilbert Adair